Russell Charles Osman (born 14 February 1959) is an English former professional footballer who played as a centre back in the Football League for Ipswich Town, Leicester City, Southampton, Bristol City, Brighton & Hove Albion and Cardiff City. Osman played senior international football for England, for whom he received eleven caps. He is now a football pundit in the Indian Super League.

Playing career
Osman was born in Repton, Derbyshire, the son of Rex Osman who played a handful of games for Derby County in the early 1950s. Osman played nearly 400 games for Ipswich Town, winning the 1980–81 UEFA Cup. Osman also contributed to Ipswich's victorious 1977–78 FA Cup campaign, making four appearances during the run. However he wasn't part of the squad for the final itself. Osman also represented his country 11 times. His first England cap came against Australia in a friendly on 31 May 1980, his last on 21 September 1983 in England's 1–0 Euro 84 qualifying match defeat to Denmark.

Managerial career
Later in his playing career he was player-manager of Bristol City, and had a brief spell as caretaker manager of Plymouth Argyle before later managing Cardiff City. He had a brief role as joint caretaker manager of Bristol Rovers in 2004. In November 2007, he was appointed as assistant manager to Paul Tisdale at Exeter City. In February 2011 he was appointed coach of the Ipswich Town Under 18s. He left the role in August 2013. In July 2015 Osman joined Newport County as assistant manager to Terry Butcher. Butcher, Osman and Steve Marsalla were sacked on 1 October 2015 with Newport bottom of league two after gaining just 5 points from the first 10 matches of the 2015–16 season.

Escape to Victory
He played Doug Clure, one of the prisoner-of-war footballers, in  the 1981 film Escape to Victory, which also included American actor Sylvester Stallone, British actor Michael Caine, Swedish actor Max von Sydow, and football stars Pelé, Ossie Ardiles, and Kazimierz Deyna. The film was based on a game between an Allied team and a Nazi German team during the Second World War.

Career statistics

Honours
Ipswich Town
UEFA Cup: 1981

Individual
Football League First Division PFA Team of the Year: 1980–81
Ipswich Town Hall of Fame: Inducted 2011

References

External links

Living people
1959 births
People from Repton
English footballers
Footballers from Derbyshire
Association football central defenders
England international footballers
England B international footballers
England under-21 international footballers
English Football League players
Ipswich Town F.C. players
Leicester City F.C. players
Southampton F.C. players
Bristol City F.C. players
Sudbury Town F.C. players
Plymouth Argyle F.C. players
Brighton & Hove Albion F.C. players
English football managers
Cardiff City F.C. players
Bristol City F.C. managers
Cardiff City F.C. managers
Bristol Rovers F.C. managers
Exeter City F.C. non-playing staff
Newport County A.F.C. non-playing staff
UEFA Cup winning players
Outfield association footballers who played in goal